The title of Cape Wine Master is one of the most sought after formal qualifications in the wine industry. The qualification was first instituted in 1983, and over the last 38 years only 106 candidates (55 men and 51 women) have qualified to become Cape Wine Masters, and a further 3 were awarded the title of Honorary Cape Wine Masters. The Institute of Cape Wine Masters (ICWM) is an active group of knowledgeable people who are formally qualified, objective, passionate and informed on local and international wine matters. The Institute runs wine tastings and other wine events. The purpose of the ICWM is to harness their collective ability as Cape Wine Masters to open the world of wine and brandy to others through their knowledge, deep understanding and love for wine.

ICWM mission 
The ICWM pursues the goal of excellence in the wine industry and aims to promote:
 wine and spirit education in South Africa
 the image and interest of the members of the Institute
 the responsible use of wine

ICWM culture 
Cape Wine Masters are expected to:
 promote the growth and use of wine
 promote wine education at all levels
 promote the image of CWM's by enhancing their credibility, visibility and recognition
 promote the qualification which should be sought-after for anyone wishing to advance in the wine trade
 be an ambassador of wine
 act as a catalyst to help the industry move forward
 assist the industry to keep pace with the changes and trends in world wine markets

ICWM executive committee 
The Institute of Cape Wine Masters is managed by a 6-member Executive Committee. The 2021 – 2022 committee consists of the following members:
 Chairperson – Jacques Steyn
 Vice-Chairperson & Educom Representative – Heidi Duminy
 Treasurer – Tom Blok
 Secretary & Communications Officer - Debi van Flymen
 Northern Representative – Kristina Beuthner
 Southern Representative - Harry Melck

History
The first 3 Cape Wine Masters (Duimpie Bayly, Bennie Howard and the late Tony Mossop) wrote and passed their examinations in 1983, but were only awarded their diplomas on the 19th of July 1984! The ceremony took place at a cocktail function, held in the office of Godfrey de Bruyn, the Chairman of the Cape Wine and Spirit Education Trust, which was formed by the wine industry to coordinate the training and education of industry related people, and also to confer the CWM diplomas. Not more than 20 people were present at the office in Dorp Street in Stellenbosch, to witness the handing over of the diplomas to the 3 new graduates!

The title of Honorary Cape Wine Master was awarded to Dave Hughes, Phyllis Hands and Colin Frith. They were given Honorary status due to the fact that they were the examiners during the first 12 years of the CWM programme and could never write the exams themselves, and for doing the ground breaking and outstanding work to start the CWM programme. Dave Hughes was head of Consumer Relations at SFW at the time and was overall responsible for the CWA and had a wealth of wine experience. Phyllis Hands was Principal of the Cape Wine Academy from its inception in 1979 and well known for her wine knowledge and training wine people. Colin Frith was appointed as wine buyer at SFW in 1982, and brought with him a huge amount of knowledge regarding international wines with his vast background of wine in the UK retail trade. In 2003 the Cape Wine and Spirit Education Trust granted the Cape Wine Academy the right to award the Cape Wine Master qualification and confer the Cape Wine Master's title, in collaboration with the Institute of Cape Wine Masters. Founded in 1979, the Cape Wine Academy is recognised as the official wine education and training institution in South Africa.

CWM study programme 
Course overview:

The Cape Wine Academy provides a range of social and professional wine courses for individuals and tertiary institutions and specialises in creating bespoke wine-tasting events for corporate clients. The starting point to learning about wine is the South African Wine Course. On completion of an exam, students can join the Certificate Wine Course, followed by the 2-year Diploma Wine Course, and ultimately the Cape Wine Master programme, the highest qualification in wine education in South Africa. The Cape Wine Master qualification is a self-study course, and there are no formal lectures or tastings. Most candidates form or join study support groups. Candidates are provided with a mentor who will provide guidance and support.

Students must successfully complete the following programme elements to achieve the Cape Wine Master qualification:
 Four tasting exams of international and South African wines - Natural wine / Sparkling wine / Dessert- and Fortified wine / brandy
 Four theory exams - viticulture / viniculture / distilled and other products / general knowledge
 A dissertation on a topic that has been approved by the examining committee
 Present a formal tasting to an examining panel

In the first year of registration, it is compulsory to sit all four tasting exams AND one theory exam.

Cost: on application

Course requirements:

Once candidates have successfully completed the 4-module Diploma Wine Course at the Cape Wine Academy, with an average pass mark of 60%, they can apply to study toward the qualification of Cape Wine Master. Passion for wine is an imperative for the journey toward becoming a Cape Wine Master. There is no requirement that candidates should be involved directly in the wine industry or wine education. It is likely that people who are this committed to the enjoyment and knowledge of wine will be involved in lecturing at the Cape Wine Academy or hosting wine tastings in their community.

Course duration:

Candidates have a total of 5 years from the date of registration to complete the various components of the qualification. If candidates complete the 4-module Diploma Wine Course in June, they could register to write CWM exams in October of the same year.

Members 
Since the programme's inception in 1983, a total number of 106 members have qualified to obtain the title of Cape Wine Master. A further three (Colin Frith, Phyllis Hands and Dave Hughes) were awarded honorary membership, which brings the total number of graduates to 109. 

Membership list according to year of qualification:
 1983 Bayly, Duimpie / Howard, Bennie / Mossop, Tony
 1984 Brown, Robin (Dr) / Koff, Peter
 1985 Bregman, Rowena
 1986 Burger, Gert (Dr) / Cooper-Williams, Bill / Johnson, Dave / Mullins, Allan / Rudman, Christine
 1987 Grier, Jeff
 1988 Claassens, Michael / Gold, Penny / Sherriff, Lynne / Von Holdt, Irina
 1989 Van Wyk, Sue
 1991 Davidson, Dick / Nel, Carel
 1992 Benade, Paul / Brown, Sue
 1993 Fry, Margaret / Mauff, Alf / Van Teijlingen, Charl
 1994 Fuller-Drury, Loraine / Kartsounis, Val / Torr, Clive
 1995 Davel, Henry / Gebler, Peter / Willis, Geoff
 1996 Brewer, Cathy
 1997 Nel, Boets
 1998 Cecchini, Gulio / Ludwinski, Gerald
 1999 Brown, Marietjie / Cooper, Marilyn / Du Toit, Stephan / Esbach, Pieter
 2000 Bargmann, Chris / Barker, Margie / De Bruin, Greg / Pells, Elsie / White, Cathy
 2001 James Tim / Spies, Cornel
 2004 Barker, Berenice / Duminy, Heidi / Fallon, Margie / Ratcliffe-Wright, Jenny / Snyman, Caroline (Dr) / Vermeulen, Junel
 2005 De Fleuriot, Ginette
 2006 Galpin, Vashti / Gold, Brad / Green, Karen / Krige, Hymli / Steenkamp, Debruyn
 2007 Blok, Tom / De Klerk, Chris / Mitchell, Andy / Mouton, Gerda / Roediger, Andy (Dr) / Salamon, Andras / Weaver, Meryl
 2008 Bowman Winifred (Dr) / Loubser, Hennie
 2009 Bauer, Rolene (Dr) / Blaauw, Duane / Le Roux, Danielle / Raath, Mary-Lyn / Vardas, Eftyhia
 2010 Beuthner, Kristina / Lee, Mike / Newton, Sarah / Woodward, Lyn
 2011 Berrie, Leigh / Dillon, Catherine / Nash, Mary-Lou
 2012 March, Dave / Noppé, Raymond / Ramsden, Derek / Tolken, Lizette
 2014 Bezuidenhout, Francois / Bruwer, Nina-Mari / Harper, Sandy / Louw, Conrad / Malan, Marius / Van Flymen, Debi
 2015 Gomez, Martin / Le Riche, Yvonne
 2016 Briers-Louw, Janno / Steyn, Jacques / Visser, Karin
 2017 Butler, Brendan / Cillié, Francois / Oertle, Ivan / Swarts, Anton
 2018 Melck, Harry
 2019 Henderson, Jacqui
 2020 Bloom, Karen / Cronjé, Wanda / De Villiers, Lisha / Gerber, Boela
 2021 Groenewald, Rene / van der Merwe, Lieza / Whittaker, Gavin

In memoriam
 Cooper-Williams, Bill (2021)
 Bregman, Rowena
 Burger, Gert (Dr)
 Mitchell, Andy (2014)
 Mossop, Tony (1942–2005)
 Mullins, Allan (1948 - 2020
 Willis, Geoff (2021)

Dissertations 
As part of the course requirements, all candidates are required to write a dissertation on a topic that has been approved by the examining committee. Copies of all Cape Wine Master dissertations are held in the SAWIS library in Paarl. A full list of each members' dissertation can be viewed on the official website of the ICWM (www.icwm.co.za).

Wine Personality of the Year 
Since 1993, the Institute of Cape Wine Masters has presented its annual Wine Personality of the Year award at the black-tie dinner following its AGM in May. This prestigious award is dedicated to those people in the South African wine industry that have excelled above others in education, marketing, winemaking or spreading the message about wine in various ways.

See also
 Master of Wine

References
www.icwm.co.za
www.capewineacademy.co.za

Education in South Africa
Professional titles and certifications
Wine tasting